In mathematics, specifically in calculus and complex analysis, the logarithmic derivative of a function f is defined by the formula

where  is the derivative of f. Intuitively, this is the infinitesimal relative change in f; that is, the infinitesimal absolute change in f, namely  scaled by the current value of f.

When f is a function f(x) of a real variable x, and takes real, strictly positive values, this is equal to the derivative of ln(f), or the natural logarithm of f. This follows directly from the chain rule:

Basic properties
Many properties of the real logarithm also apply to the logarithmic derivative, even when the function does not take values in the positive reals. For example, since the logarithm of a product is the sum of the logarithms of the factors, we have

So for positive-real-valued functions, the logarithmic derivative of a product is the sum of the logarithmic derivatives of the factors. But we can also use the Leibniz law for the derivative of a product to get

Thus, it is true for any function that the logarithmic derivative of a product is the sum of the logarithmic derivatives of the factors (when they are defined).

A corollary to this is that the logarithmic derivative of the reciprocal of a function is the negation of the logarithmic derivative of the function:

just as the logarithm of the reciprocal of a positive real number is the negation of the logarithm of the number.

More generally, the logarithmic derivative of a quotient is the difference of the logarithmic derivatives of the dividend and the divisor:

just as the logarithm of a quotient is the difference of the logarithms of the dividend and the divisor.

Generalising in another direction, the logarithmic derivative of a power (with constant real exponent) is the product of the exponent and the logarithmic derivative of the base:

just as the logarithm of a power is the product of the exponent and the logarithm of the base.

In summary, both derivatives and logarithms have a product rule, a reciprocal rule, a quotient rule, and a power rule (compare the list of logarithmic identities); each pair of rules is related through the logarithmic derivative.

Computing ordinary derivatives using logarithmic derivatives

Logarithmic derivatives can simplify the computation of derivatives requiring the product rule while producing the same result. The procedure is as follows: Suppose that  and that we wish to compute . That is, we compute:

Multiplying through by ƒ computes :

This technique is most useful when ƒ is a product of a large number of factors.

Integrating factors
The logarithmic derivative idea is closely connected to the integrating factor method for first-order differential equations. In operator terms, write  and let M denote the operator of multiplication by some given function G(x). Then  can be written (by the product rule) as  where  now denotes the multiplication operator by the logarithmic derivative 

In practice we are given an operator such as

and wish to solve equations

for the function h, given f. This then reduces to solving

which has as solution

with any indefinite integral of F.

Complex analysis

The formula as given can be applied more widely; for example if f(z) is a meromorphic function, it makes sense at all complex values of z at which f has neither a zero nor a pole. Further, at a zero or a pole the logarithmic derivative behaves in a way that is easily analysed in terms of the particular case

zn

with n an integer, . The logarithmic derivative is then

and one can draw the general conclusion that for f meromorphic, the singularities of the logarithmic derivative of f are all simple poles, with residue n from a zero of order n, residue −n from a pole of order n. See argument principle. This information is often exploited in contour integration.

In the field of Nevanlinna Theory, an important lemma states that the proximity function of a logarithmic derivative is small with respect to the Nevanlinna Characteristic of the original function, for instance .

The multiplicative group
Behind the use of the logarithmic derivative lie two basic facts about GL1, that is, the multiplicative group of real numbers or other field. The differential operator

is invariant under dilation (replacing X by aX for a constant). And the differential form  is likewise invariant. For functions F into GL1, the formula
 is therefore a pullback of the invariant form.

Examples
 Exponential growth and exponential decay are processes with constant logarithmic derivative.
 In mathematical finance, the Greek λ is the logarithmic derivative of derivative price with respect to underlying price.
 In numerical analysis, the condition number is the infinitesimal relative change in the output for a relative change in the input, and is thus a ratio of logarithmic derivatives.

See also

 
 
 Elasticity of a function

References

Differential calculus
Complex analysis